Mayor Radhakrishnan Stadium is a field hockey stadium at Chennai, Tamil Nadu, India. Named after M. Radhakrishna Pillai, it was the venue to the 1996 Men's Champions Trophy, and hosted the tournament again in December 2005. It was also the venue for 2007 edition of Asian Hockey Championship, in which India triumphed by a thumping margin of 7–2 over South Korea.
It is also the venue for all division matches of the Chennai Hockey Association and the home ground of the World Series Hockey team Chennai Cheetahs.

Major international events

1996 Men's Hockey Champions Trophy

The 1996 Men's Champions Trophy took place from 7–15 December 1996 in the newly built Mayor Radhakrishnan Stadium in Madras (now Chennai), India. Participating nations in this post-Olympic tournament were: Australia, titleholders Germany, hosting nation India, Netherlands, Pakistan, and Spain.

2005 Hockey Champions Trophy

The 2005 Men's Hockey Champions Trophy is the 27th tournament of the Hockey Champions Trophy for men. It was held in Chennai, India from 10 to 18 December 2005.

2007 Men's Hockey Asia Cup

The 2007 Men's Hockey Asia Cup is the seventh tournament of the Hockey Asia Cup for men. It was held from 31 August – 9 September 2007 in Chennai, India.India claimed the gold, Korea the silver and Malaysia the bronze.

Major domestic events
 All India MCC Murugappa Gold Cup Hockey Tournament, Chennai
 2012 World Series Hockey

Renovation
In 2004, the stadium was redesigned and upgraded by the Sports Authority of Tamil Nadu to prepare the venue for hosting the 2005 Champions Trophy in December. After the renovation drive, the stadium features a re-laid synthetic hockey surface and floodlights of international standards.

References

Field hockey venues in India
Sports venues in Chennai
Sports venues completed in 1995
1995 establishments in Tamil Nadu
20th-century architecture in India